Batman: Thrillkiller is a one-shot comic book published in 1997, with one three-issue miniseries and one one-shot collected into one volume:
Batgirl and Robin: Thrillkiller (1997) - Barbara Gordon (Batgirl) and Dick Grayson (Robin) as part of the 1960s counterculture.
Batgirl and Batman: Thrillkiller '62 (1998) - Bruce Wayne becomes Batman in the follow-up.

Plot

The story begins in 1961, a time of transition between the 1950s and the dawn of the Sexual Revolution and the Vietnam War.  Nobody could anticipate the darkness that lay ahead, especially between the two masked defenders Batgirl and Robin. For them, the joyride was about to end, and the last stop was death.

References

1997 comics debuts
Elseworlds titles
Fiction set in 1961
Fiction set in the 1960s